Veer Chandra Singh Garhwali Uttarakhand University of Horticulture & Forestry, formerly Uttarakhand University of Horticulture and Forestry, is a state agricultural university located in North Indian state of Uttarakhand. The University has two campuses, one is in Bharsar town of Pauri Garhwal district and other is in Ranichauri town of Tehri Garhwal district.

History

The Uttarakhand University of Horticulture and Forestry was established in 2011 by an act (Act No. 13 of 2011) passed by Uttarakhand Legislative Assembly in April 2011.

In 2015 it was renamed through The Uttarakhand Krishi Evam Prodyogik Vishwavidyalaya (Second Amendment) Act, 2014.

Campus

Bharsar campus

VCSG College of Horticulture is situated at Bharsar in Pabao Block of District Pauri Garhwal on Pauri - Ramnagar Highway (NH- 121) about 57 km from Pauri. It is spread over an area of 175 hectares consisting of forest and orchards at an altitude ranging between 1800 and 2300 m above msl. The geographical and climatic conditions of the region are considered to be ideal for Horticulture. The College has been named in the honour of freedom fighter Late Veer Chandra Singh Garhwali who was associated with Peshawar events of 1931

Ranichauri campus

The College of Forestry situated at Ranichauri in Tehri Garhwal about 15 km from New Tehri, 71 km from Rishikesh and 110 km from Dehradun on Rishikesh - New Tehri Road. It is spread over an area of 203 hectares consisting of forest, orchards and various research blocks at an altitude ranging between 1700 and 2200 m above msl. The geographical and climatic conditions of the region are considered to be suitable for different forest species, wild fruits, horticultural crops, off season vegetables, medicinal and aromatic plants, minor millets and pulses.

Academics

 College of Horticulture, Bharsar, Pauri Garhwal, Uttarakhand
 College of Forestry, Ranichauri, Tehri Garhwal, Uttarakhand
 College of Hill Agriculture, Chirbatiya, Rudraprayag, Uttarakhand
 Institute of Medicinal and Aromatic Plants, Gairsain, Rudraprayag, Uttarakhand
 Institute of Food Science & Technology, Majrigrant, Dehradun

References

External links
 

Agricultural universities and colleges in India
Universities in Uttarakhand
Horticulture in India
Forestry education in India
Educational institutions established in 2011
2011 establishments in Uttarakhand
Environment of Uttarakhand